The Altai constituency (No. 2) is a Russian legislative constituency covering the entirety of the Altai Republic.

Members elected

Election results

1993

|-
! colspan=2 style="background-color:#E9E9E9;text-align:left;vertical-align:top;" |Candidate
! style="background-color:#E9E9E9;text-align:left;vertical-align:top;" |Party
! style="background-color:#E9E9E9;text-align:right;" |Votes
! style="background-color:#E9E9E9;text-align:right;" |%
|-
|style="background-color:"|
|align=left|Mikhail Gnezdilov
|align=left|Independent
|
|23.02%
|-
|style="background-color:"|
|align=left|Faina Yakshimayeva
|align=left|Independent
| -
|19.24%
|-
| colspan="5" style="background-color:#E9E9E9;"|
|- style="font-weight:bold"
| colspan="3" style="text-align:left;" | Total
| 
| 100%
|-
| colspan="5" style="background-color:#E9E9E9;"|
|- style="font-weight:bold"
| colspan="4" |Source:
|
|}

1995

|-
! colspan=2 style="background-color:#E9E9E9;text-align:left;vertical-align:top;" |Candidate
! style="background-color:#E9E9E9;text-align:left;vertical-align:top;" |Party
! style="background-color:#E9E9E9;text-align:right;" |Votes
! style="background-color:#E9E9E9;text-align:right;" |%
|-
|style="background-color:#3A46CE"|
|align=left|Semyon Zubakin
|align=left|Democratic Choice of Russia – United Democrats
|
|21.71%
|-
|style="background-color:"|
|align=left|Vladimir Kydyyev
|align=left|Independent
|
|17.29%
|-
|style="background-color:"|
|align=left|Mikhail Gnezdilov (incumbent)
|align=left|Independent
|
|12.33%
|-
|style="background-color:"|
|align=left|Nikolay Chekonov
|align=left|Communist Party
|
|11.60%
|-
|style="background-color:"|
|align=left|Natalya Kyrova
|align=left|Independent
|
|10.08%
|-
|style="background-color:"|
|align=left|Vladilen Volkov
|align=left|Independent
|
|6.87%
|-
|style="background-color:"|
|align=left|Faina Yakshimayeva
|align=left|Independent
|
|5.12%
|-
|style="background-color:#1C1A0D"|
|align=left|Vitaly Gurov
|align=left|Forward, Russia!
|
|1.75%
|-
|style="background-color:#2C299A"|
|align=left|Yevgeny Butov
|align=left|Congress of Russian Communities
|
|1.24%
|-
|style="background-color:"|
|align=left|Valery Sat
|align=left|Independent
|
|1.23%
|-
|style="background-color:"|
|align=left|Stanislav Kedik
|align=left|Independent
|
|0.46%
|-
|style="background-color:#000000"|
|colspan=2 |against all
|
|8.05%
|-
| colspan="5" style="background-color:#E9E9E9;"|
|- style="font-weight:bold"
| colspan="3" style="text-align:left;" | Total
| 
| 100%
|-
| colspan="5" style="background-color:#E9E9E9;"|
|- style="font-weight:bold"
| colspan="4" |Source:
|
|}

1998

|-
! colspan=2 style="background-color:#E9E9E9;text-align:left;vertical-align:top;" |Candidate
! style="background-color:#E9E9E9;text-align:left;vertical-align:top;" |Party
! style="background-color:#E9E9E9;text-align:right;" |Votes
! style="background-color:#E9E9E9;text-align:right;" |%
|-
|style="background-color:"|
|align=left|Mikhail Lapshin
|align=left|Independent
|
|42.22%
|-
|style="background-color:"|
|align=left|Andrey Vavilov
|align=left|Independent
|
|40.65%
|-
|style="background-color:"|
|align=left|I. Chernov
|align=left|Independent
|
|2.44%
|-
|style="background-color:#000000"|
|colspan=2 |against all
|
|6.81%
|-
| colspan="5" style="background-color:#E9E9E9;"|
|- style="font-weight:bold"
| colspan="3" style="text-align:left;" | Total
| -
| 100%
|-
| colspan="5" style="background-color:#E9E9E9;"|
|- style="font-weight:bold"
| colspan="4" |Source:
|
|}

1999

|-
! colspan=2 style="background-color:#E9E9E9;text-align:left;vertical-align:top;" |Candidate
! style="background-color:#E9E9E9;text-align:left;vertical-align:top;" |Party
! style="background-color:#E9E9E9;text-align:right;" |Votes
! style="background-color:#E9E9E9;text-align:right;" |%
|-
|style="background-color:#3B9EDF"|
|align=left|Mikhail Lapshin (incumbent)
|align=left|Fatherland – All Russia
|
|32.11%
|-
|style="background-color:#020266"|
|align=left|Yury Antaradonov
|align=left|Russian Socialist Party
|
|26.97%
|-
|style="background-color:"|
|align=left|Viktor Romashkin
|align=left|Communist Party
|
|14.98%
|-
|style="background-color:"|
|align=left|Vladimir Slesarev
|align=left|Unity
|
|7.02%
|-
|style="background-color:"|
|align=left|Vladimir Petrov
|align=left|Our Home – Russia
|
|6.34%
|-
|style="background-color:"|
|align=left|Nadezhda Sukhoterina
|align=left|Independent
|
|1.61%
|-
|style="background-color:"|
|align=left|Anatoly Yevdokimov
|align=left|Liberal Democratic Party
|
|1.23%
|-
|style="background-color:#1042A5"|
|align=left|Yury Chernichenko
|align=left|Union of Right Forces
|
|1.13%
|-
|style="background-color:#084284"|
|align=left|Dalel Sakharyanov
|align=left|Spiritual Heritage
|
|0.84%
|-
|style="background-color:#000000"|
|colspan=2 |against all
|
|5.71%
|-
| colspan="5" style="background-color:#E9E9E9;"|
|- style="font-weight:bold"
| colspan="3" style="text-align:left;" | Total
| 
| 100%
|-
| colspan="5" style="background-color:#E9E9E9;"|
|- style="font-weight:bold"
| colspan="4" |Source:
|
|}

2002

|-
! colspan=2 style="background-color:#E9E9E9;text-align:left;vertical-align:top;" |Candidate
! style="background-color:#E9E9E9;text-align:left;vertical-align:top;" |Party
! style="background-color:#E9E9E9;text-align:right;" |Votes
! style="background-color:#E9E9E9;text-align:right;" |%
|-
|style="background-color:"|
|align=left|Sergey Pekpeyev
|align=left|Independent
|
|48.57%
|-
|style="background-color:"|
|align=left|Sergey Ognev
|align=left|Independent
|
|19.19%
|-
|style="background-color:"|
|align=left|Vladimir Grishin
|align=left|Independent
|
|11.28%
|-
|style="background-color:"|
|align=left|Leonid Shchuchinov
|align=left|Independent
|
|8.91%
|-
|style="background-color:"|
|align=left|Aleksandr Shegay
|align=left|Independent
|
|1.56%
|-
|style="background-color:"|
|align=left|Sergey Kochetkov
|align=left|Independent
|
|1.25%
|-
|style="background-color:#000000"|
|colspan=2 |against all
|
|6.26%
|-
| colspan="5" style="background-color:#E9E9E9;"|
|- style="font-weight:bold"
| colspan="3" style="text-align:left;" | Total
| 
| 100%
|-
| colspan="5" style="background-color:#E9E9E9;"|
|- style="font-weight:bold"
| colspan="4" |Source:
|
|}

2003

|-
! colspan=2 style="background-color:#E9E9E9;text-align:left;vertical-align:top;" |Candidate
! style="background-color:#E9E9E9;text-align:left;vertical-align:top;" |Party
! style="background-color:#E9E9E9;text-align:right;" |Votes
! style="background-color:#E9E9E9;text-align:right;" |%
|-
|style="background-color:"|
|align=left|Sergey Pekpeyev (incumbent)
|align=left|Agrarian Party
|
|39.62%
|-
|style="background-color:"|
|align=left|Yury Streltsov
|align=left|Independent
|
|22.58%
|-
|style="background-color:#1042A5"|
|align=left|Viktor Bezruchenkov
|align=left|Union of Right Forces
|
|10.08%
|-
|style="background-color:"|
|align=left|Nikolay Chekonov
|align=left|Communist Party
|
|6.43%
|-
|style="background-color:"|
|align=left|Igor Yeremin
|align=left|Independent
|
|4.99%
|-
|style="background-color:"|
|align=left|Nina Dumnova
|align=left|Independent
|
|3.02%
|-
|style="background-color:"|
|align=left|Mikhail Lazarev
|align=left|Liberal Democratic Party
|
|2.06%
|-
|style="background-color:"|
|align=left|Tatyana Zharova
|align=left|The Greens
|
|1.60%
|-
|style="background:"| 
|align=left|Vladimir Grishin
|align=left|Rodina
|
|1.54%
|-
|style="background-color:"|
|align=left|Aleksey Kuchigashev
|align=left|Independent
|
|0.61%
|-
|style="background-color:"|
|align=left|Sergey Kochetkov
|align=left|Independent
|
|0.40%
|-
|style="background-color:#000000"|
|colspan=2 |against all
|
|5.86%
|-
| colspan="5" style="background-color:#E9E9E9;"|
|- style="font-weight:bold"
| colspan="3" style="text-align:left;" | Total
| 
| 100%
|-
| colspan="5" style="background-color:#E9E9E9;"|
|- style="font-weight:bold"
| colspan="4" |Source:
|
|}

2016

|-
! colspan=2 style="background-color:#E9E9E9;text-align:left;vertical-align:top;" |Candidate
! style="background-color:#E9E9E9;text-align:leftt;vertical-align:top;" |Party
! style="background-color:#E9E9E9;text-align:right;" |Votes
! style="background-color:#E9E9E9;text-align:right;" |%
|-
|style="background-color:"|
|align=left|Rodion Bukachakov
|align=left|United Russia
|
|44.79%
|-
|style="background-color:"|
|align=left|Viktor Romashkin
|align=left|Communist Party
|
|20.39%
|-
|style="background:"| 
|align=left|Maria Demina
|align=left|Rodina
|
|13.42%
|-
|style="background-color:"|
|align=left|Timur Kazitov
|align=left|Liberal Democratic Party
|
|8.54%
|-
|style="background:"| 
|align=left|Urmat Knyazev
|align=left|People's Freedom Party
|
|4.93%
|-
|style="background:"| 
|align=left|Aleksandr Gruzdev
|align=left|A Just Russia
|
|2.76%
|-
|style="background:"| 
|align=left|Dmitry Dumnov
|align=left|Yabloko
|
|0.96%
|-
|style="background:#00A650"| 
|align=left|Irina Zveryako
|align=left|Civilian Power
|
|0.83%
|-
|style="background-color: " |
|align=left|Aleksandr Chervov
|align=left|Communists of Russia
|
|0.51%
|-
| colspan="5" style="background-color:#E9E9E9;"|
|- style="font-weight:bold"
| colspan="3" style="text-align:left;" | Total
| 
| 100%
|-
| colspan="5" style="background-color:#E9E9E9;"|
|- style="font-weight:bold"
| colspan="4" |Source:
|
|}

2021

|-
! colspan=2 style="background-color:#E9E9E9;text-align:left;vertical-align:top;" |Candidate
! style="background-color:#E9E9E9;text-align:left;vertical-align:top;" |Party
! style="background-color:#E9E9E9;text-align:right;" |Votes
! style="background-color:#E9E9E9;text-align:right;" |%
|-
|style="background-color:"|
|align=left|Roman Ptitsyn
|align=left|United Russia
|
|31.99%
|-
|style="background-color:"|
|align=left|Maria Demina
|align=left|Communist Party
|
|29.84%
|-
|style="background-color: " |
|align=left|Aleksey Tyukhtenev
|align=left|A Just Russia — For Truth
|
|16.09%
|-
|style="background-color:"|
|align=left|Dmitry Sofronov
|align=left|Liberal Democratic Party
|
|5.20%
|-
|style="background:"| 
|align=left|Maria Ardimatova
|align=left|New People
|
|3.74%
|-
|style="background-color: "|
|align=left|Vasily Kudirmekov
|align=left|Russian Party of Freedom and Justice
|
|3.38%
|-
|style="background-color: " |
|align=left|Yelena Tudeneva
|align=left|Communists of Russia
|
|2.64%
|-
|style="background-color: "|
|align=left|Nikolay Tolkochokov
|align=left|Party of Pensioners
|
|2.25%
|-
|style="background-color:"|
|align=left|Lyudmila Shuvalova
|align=left|The Greens
|
|1.87%
|-
| colspan="5" style="background-color:#E9E9E9;"|
|- style="font-weight:bold"
| colspan="3" style="text-align:left;" | Total
| 
| 100%
|-
| colspan="5" style="background-color:#E9E9E9;"|
|- style="font-weight:bold"
| colspan="4" |Source:
|
|}

Notes

References

Russian legislative constituencies
Politics of the Altai Republic